This is a list of South Korean films that received a domestic theatrical release in 1992.

References

Notes

See also
1992 in South Korea

External links

 1992-1995 at www.koreanfilm.org

1992
South Korean
1992 in South Korea